Louis Gros may refer to:

 Louis Prosper Gros (1893–1973), flying ace during World War I
 Louis Le Gros (1893–1969), politician from Senegal